DOCSIS Set-top Gateway (or DSG) is a specification describing how out-of-band data is delivered to a cable set-top box. Cable set-top boxes need a reliable source of out of band data for information such as program guides, channel lineups, and updated code images.

Features 
DSG is an extension of the DOCSIS protocol governing cable modems, and applies to all versions of DOCSIS.

The principal features of DSG are:

One-way operation 
The original DOCSIS protocol supports only two way connectivity. A cable modem that is unable to acquire an upstream channel will give up and resume scanning for new channels. Likewise, persistent upstream errors will cause a cable modem to "reinitialize its MAC" and scan for new downstream channels.  This behavior is appropriate for traditional cable modems, but not for cable set-top boxes. A cable set-top box still needs to acquire its out of band data even if the upstream channel is impaired.

The DSG specification introduced one way (downstream only) modes of operation. When upstream errors occur, the set-top enters a downstream-only state, periodically attempting to reacquire the upstream channel.

Defining how to recognize the correct downstream channel  
Set-top out of band data is generally present only on certain downstream channels. The set-top needs a way to distinguish a valid downstream (containing the set-top's data) from an invalid one used only by standalone cable modems.

The DSG specification defines a special downstream keep-alive message so that the set-top can recognize an appropriate downstream channel.

Creating an out-of-band directory 
The Advanced Mode of the DSG Specification introduces a special MAC Management message called the Downstream Channel Descriptor (DCD). The DCD provides a directory identifying the MAC and IP parameters associated with the out of band data streams.

Each data consumer is assigned a special Client Identifier that names the out of band data stream in the DCD.

SNMP MIBs 
The DSG Specification creates two new SNMP management information bases (MIBs) to manage DSG devices. One MIB is used by the set-top, the other by the cable modem termination system (CMTS).

Architecture 
A DSG network comprises three components. The Conditional Access Server generates a stream of out of band data. The DSG Agent (the CMTS) forwards the out of band data and publishes the out of band directory (the DCD). The DSG client on the set-top digests the DSG data.

The set-top device comprises three subcomponents. The DSG-capable cable modem is referred to as the DSG eCM (Embedded Cable Modem). A data consumer is called a DSG Client (there are generally many of these.) Finally, the eCM is configured and controlled by a component called the DSG Client Controller.

See also 
 Residential gateway

References 

Broadcasting standards
Digital cable
Set-top box